Len Waters Estate is a small industrial estate of Sydney, in the state of New South Wales, Australia. Len Waters Estate is located 39 kilometres south-west of the Sydney central business district, in the local government area of the City of Liverpool.

Background
It was named in honour of Len Waters, the first Aboriginal Australian military aviator. Along with Elizabeth Hills, Len Waters Estate used to be part of a greater Cecil Hills until being developed by Mirvac. Len Waters Estate occupies land formerly part of Hoxton Park Airport. This small industrial suburb mostly consists of two distribution centres, a Transit Systems bus depot and a Bunnings Warehouse hardware store.

See also 

 Len Waters

 Hoxton Park Airport

References

Suburbs of Sydney
City of Liverpool (New South Wales)